Kgakgamotso Pharo (born 17 June 1982) is a Botswana footballer who currently plays as a striker for Boteti Young Fighters. He won four caps for the Botswana national football team in 2005.

See also
Football in Botswana

References

External links
 

Association football forwards
Botswana footballers
Gilport Lions F.C. players
Botswana international footballers
1982 births
Living people
Botswana Defence Force XI F.C. players
TAFIC F.C. players